The men's sprint competition of the Biathlon World Championships 2012 was held on March 3, 2012 at 12:30 local time.

Results

References

Biathlon World Championships 2012